Cheshmeh-ye Gari Deli Gerdu (also Romanized as Cheshmeh-ye Garī Delī Gerdū; also known as Cheshmeh-ye Garī) is a village in Margown Rural District, Margown District, Boyer-Ahmad County, Kohgiluyeh and Boyer-Ahmad Province, Iran. At the 2006 census, its population was 25, in 6 families.

References 

Populated places in Boyer-Ahmad County